The 1961 East Carolina Pirates football team represented East Carolina College—now known as East Carolina University—during the 1961 NCAA College Division football season.

Schedule

References

East Carolina
East Carolina Pirates football seasons
East Car